Mezhgorye (Mejgorye) is a closed town in the Republic of Bashkortostan, Russia, located in the southern Ural Mountains near Mount Yamantau, about  southeast of Ufa, the capital of the republic, on the banks of the Maly Inser River (a tributary of the Kama River). Population:

History
Founded around 1979, it was known as Ufa-105 and Beloretsk-16. Town status was granted to it in 1995, at which time it was given its present name. It is the only closed town in Russia to be situated in a republic.

Administrative and municipal status
Within the framework of administrative divisions, it is incorporated as the closed administrative-territorial formation of Mezhgorye—an administrative unit with the status equal to that of the districts. As a municipal division, the closed administrative-territorial formation of Mezhgorye is incorporated as Mezhgorye Urban Okrug.

The closed status of Mezhgorye means that in administrative terms it is subordinated directly to the federal government of Russia.

References

Notes

Sources

External links
 Official website of Mezhgorye 

Cities and towns in Bashkortostan
Closed cities
Populated places established in 1979